Chained for Life is a 1952 exploitation film featuring the famous conjoined ("Siamese") Hilton Twins, Daisy and Violet. It features several vaudeville acts, including juggler Whitey Roberts, a man doing bicycle stunts, and a man, Tony Lovello, who plays the William Tell Overture and "Hungarian Dance No. 5" at breakneck speed on an accordion.

The movie incorporates aspects of the twins' real life, including their singing act, a futile attempt by one sister to obtain a marriage license, and a publicity-stunt marriage.

The twins' voices are featured in three duets, including "Every Hour of Every Day" and "Love Thief".

The movie was directed by Harry L. Fraser.

Plot

The movie opens with a judge (Norval Mitchell) begging the audience for help in resolving a terrible dilemma. The action moves to a courtroom, where Vivian Hamilton is on trial for the shooting death of her sister's lover. The story unfolds in flashback as various characters are called to testify.

Conjoined twins Dorothy and Vivian Hamilton (Daisy and Violet Hilton) have a successful vaudeville singing act, but their manager Hinkley (Allen Jenkins) thinks a publicity stunt will reinvigorate their career. He pays stunt shooter Andre Pariseau (Mario Laval) to fake a romance with one of the twins. Vivian, the brunette, dislikes Andre and wants nothing to do with the scheme, but Dorothy, the blonde, quips that she is too old to turn down a chance at love, and agrees to serve as Andre's love interest.

The ploy works, with "the girls" singing for standing room only crowds. But Dorothy actually falls in love with the scheming Andre, though he is secretly involved with his shooting-act partner, Renee (Patricia Wright).

Andre proposes marriage, but the couple is unable to obtain a marriage license due to allegations that the marriage would constitute bigamy. A desperate Dorothy convinces Vivian to seek separation surgery, even at the risk of their lives, so that she can pursue her dreams of love. Doctors, however, inform the women that such surgery is impossible. But, the doctors stress, there is no physical reason that Dorothy can not marry.

By consulting with a blind minister, Dorothy and Andre are able to obtain their marriage license. The wedding ceremony is performed on-stage before an audience of dignitaries including the mayor.

But the next day, Andre leaves Dorothy, claiming that he could not adjust to life as the husband of a conjoined twin. Vivian knows differently, because she has seen Andre and Renee kissing passionately and her suspicions of Andre are confirmed. Vivian is outraged that her sister was mistreated.

During Andre's shooting performance, Vivian seizes one of Andre's guns and shoots him dead before a horrified audience.

The film returns to the judge, who cannot decide how to dispose of the case. Justice for Andre requires that his murderer, Vivian, be executed. But this would cost the life of the innocent Dorothy. The film ends with a plea for the viewer to resolve the dilemma.

Reception
Chained for Life was later screened at the "Worst of the Worst Film Festival" held by the Great Lakes Film
Festival, along with Plan 9 from Outer Space,
Teenage Cave Man and Glen or Glenda.

See also
 List of films in the public domain in the United States
 Lazarus and Joannes Baptista Colloredo – historical conjoined twins, living in the 17th century. As reported by Henri Sauval, Lazarus was sentenced to death for killing a man, but averted the execution by pointing out that this would also kill his innocent (parasitic) twin brother Joannes Baptista.

Notes

External links 
 
 
 

1952 films
1950s exploitation films
Films directed by Harry L. Fraser
1950s English-language films
Twins in fiction
American exploitation films
American black-and-white films
1950s American films